Paddy mails, generally considered as being workmen's trains, were operated by, or for many companies to transport their workers to their place of work or between their sites of work.

Originally they were operated by railway contractors, on temporary tracks laid to remove spoil from their workings, to transport workers from their "shanty villages" to the work site. Many of these navvies as they were known were of Irish origin, hence the name given to the trains (see: Paddy).

Once the main line was built the name passed to the workmen's specials, which in many cases, were operated along the main line railways and sometimes operated by the main line companies to an exchange point where the trains were taken over by the industrial company.
 
In a time before the provision of pit-head baths it was illegal to travel in a normal service train in working clothes, so special trains were provided, usually of the railway company's most ancient coaches. There is a preserved example of such a vehicle from 1869 at the Midland Railway Centre at Butterley.

Most of the services were terminated due to competition from motor buses in the 1930s.  One much loved line was the Southwell Paddy.

Since their main line demise the name has continued in use being applied to the underground man-riding trains which operate between the pit bottom and the working coal face.

See also
 Birley Collieries
 Nunnery Colliery
 Orgreave Colliery
 Silverwood Colliery
 Treeton Colliery

References

External links
Image of a Paddy mail at Brackley
Image of a Paddy mail in Leicestershire

Rail transport in Derbyshire
Rail transport in Nottinghamshire
Rail transport in South Yorkshire
History of mining in the United Kingdom